"We Can Get It On" is the first single from Yo Gotti's fifth album, Live from the Kitchen. It was released on iTunes on May 10, 2011, for digital download.

Background
The song originally leaked in 2010 featuring R&B singer Ciara. But on the single's release date of May 10, 2011, Ciara's vocals were replaced by female singer Kayla Shelton & the bridge by Ciara was removed.

Music video
The music video was released on June 22, 2011. It was directed by Gabriel Hart. The video shows Yo Gotti sitting on the side of a pool performing to the camera and holding his girlfriend. There is also a scene where Yo Gotti is standing against a car. Ciara was not featured in the music video.

Chart performance
As of the week of July 9, 2011, "We Can Get It On" had charted at number 23 on US Billboard Hot Rap Songs. The song debuted on the US Hot R&B/Hip-Hop Songs chart 16 weeks before it debuted on the rap chart. The week of July 23, 2011, it had peaked at number 31 on the Hot R&B/Hip-Hop chart.

Charts

References

2011 singles
2011 songs
Yo Gotti songs
J Records singles
Song recordings produced by Drumma Boy
Music videos directed by Gabriel Hart
Songs written by Yo Gotti
Songs written by Drumma Boy